Edward Wolfe Moeller (January 8, 1919 – November 7, 2018) was an American professional basketball player. He played in the National Basketball League for the Youngstown Bears and Tri-Cities Blackhawks during the 1946–47 season and averaged 1.8 points per game.

References

1919 births
2018 deaths
American men's basketball players
American military personnel of World War II
Basketball players from Ohio
Guards (basketball)
Ohio State Buckeyes men's basketball players
People from Delaware, Ohio
Tri-Cities Blackhawks players
Youngstown Bears players